Henry Louis Smith (1859–1951) was the ninth president of Davidson College and the first president to not be an ordained Presbyterian minister.

Originally from Greensboro, North Carolina, Smith graduated from Davidson in 1881 but returned as a professor of physics before becoming president in 1901. It was during his time as a professor that Smith and a group of students created one of the first x-ray images in America.

During his administration, Smith led the construction of many infrastructure projects, including the establishment of the first electric light plant in town and the construction of several dormitories and academic buildings.

Smith left Davidson in 1912 to become president of Washington and Lee University and in 1929 would eventually retire in Greensboro, North Carolina.

References

External links 
 Information about the x-ray photograph

Davidson College alumni
Davidson College faculty
Washington and Lee University faculty
People from Greensboro, North Carolina
Presidents of Davidson College
1859 births
1951 deaths
Omicron Delta Kappa founders